Puella Magi Madoka Magica is a 2011 Japanese anime series created by Magica Quartet (consisting of Akiyuki Shinbo, Atsuhiro Iwakami, Gen Urobuchi, and Ume Aoki), produced by Shaft, and distributed by Aniplex. It follows the story of 14-year-old Japanese middle school student Madoka Kaname, who is offered the chance to have any wish granted on the condition that she become a magical girl and fight against evil witches.

Puella Magi Madoka Magica began development after Akiyuki Shinbo expressed his desire to work on a new magical girl series to producer Atsuhiro Iwakami while they were working on Hidamari Sketch and Bakemonogatari. During the early planning stage, Iwakami decided not to adapt an existing work in order to give Shinbo more freedom in his direction style. Gen Urobuchi and Ume Aoki then joined the project as scriptwriter and character designer respectively. The series was announced in a commercial slot during the anime series Togainu no Chi. Subsequently, more commercials were shown in the same slot revealing the characters and cast.

The first ten episodes aired on Japanese television channels MBS, TBS and CBC between January 7, 2011 and March 11, 2011. Due to the 2011 Tōhoku earthquake and tsunami, the broadcasts of episodes 11 and 12 were delayed and were later aired as a double feature on April 21, 2011. The series was released on Blu-ray Disc and DVDs between April 27, 2011 and September 21, 2011, having been delayed from the original release date of March 30, 2011 due to the earthquake. Aniplex USA licensed the series in North America and released the series in three volumes between February 14 and June 12, 2012. Manga Entertainment licensed the series in the United Kingdom and released it on BD/DVD in a complete collection on October 22, 2012.

Drama CDs are included with the first, third and fifth DVD/Blu-ray volumes and the original soundtrack by Kajiura Yuki was included in three parts with the second, fourth and sixth volumes. The soundtrack is also included with the limited-edition North American releases.

The series was retold in two animated films released in October 2012, and a third film containing an "all-new" story set after the series was released in October 2013.

Episode list

Drama CDs
Drama CDs were included with the first, third and fifth BD/DVD volumes of the Japanese release. A fourth drama CD was released at Comiket 82 in August 2012 alongside an advance film ticket set.

Home video releases
In Japan, Aniplex distributed six BD/DVD (Blu-ray Disc/Digital Versatile Disc) volumes of Puella Magi Madoka Magica in 2011, all of which were included in a box set on December 25, 2013. In the United States and Canada, Aniplex of America published three BD/DVD volumes of the series in 2012 and compiled them into a box set on September 27, 2016.

Notes

References

External links
 Official website 
 Tenth anniversary website 
 Puella Magi Madoka Magica at Aniplex 

Episodes
Puella Magi Madoka Magica